The Polish People's Party – Peasants' Agreement (PSL-PL) was a Christian agrarian political party in Poland.

History
The party was established in October 1991 by a merger of Rural Solidarity and Polish People's Party – Solidarity, the latter a splinter group from the former. In the parliamentary elections later that year it received 5.5% of the vote, winning 28 seats in the Sejm and five in the Senate. It joined the coalition governments headed by Jan Olszewski and Hanna Suchocka, with party leader Gabriel Janowski serving as Minister of Agriculture.

In spring 1993 the party left the government in protest at a lack of support for agriculture. Due to several splits and internal disagreements, the September 1993 elections saw the party's vote share fall to 2.4%. As it had failed to pass the 5% electoral threshold, it lost all its parliamentary representation. Following the elections the party disintegrated, although it was part of Solidarity Electoral Action in the 1997 elections. At a party congress on 15 January 1999 it was decided to merge into Ruch Społeczny.

Election results

Sejm

Senate

References

1991 establishments in Poland
1999 disestablishments in Poland
Agrarian parties in Poland
Christian political parties
Defunct political parties in Poland
Polish People's Party
Political parties disestablished in 1999
Political parties established in 1991